The Trawden Limestone Group is a lithostratigraphical term referring to the succession of limestone rock strata which occur in parts of Lancashire and neighbouring Yorkshire, northern England in the United Kingdom laid down within the Chadian to Brigantian sub-Stages of the Carboniferous Period.

The Trawden Limestone Group is preceded (underlain) by the Roddlesworth Formation. It is succeeded (overlain) by the Bowland Shale Formation

References

See also
Geology of Lancashire

Carboniferous System of Europe
Stratigraphy of the United Kingdom